The Durham Army Cadet Force (Durham ACF) is the county cadet force for Durham, which operates as part of the Army Cadet Force.  Since 2014, the county has been part of Headquarters North East and comprises approximately 850 cadets and 200 adult volunteers in 41 detachments and four companies, including a well known band and bugle corps.

Background 
In 1863, along with the formation of the Volunteer Force, the first government sanctioned cadet groups were allowed to be formed.  These groups would mostly be formed in connection with existing volunteer companies and battalions.  Following the Territorial and Reserve Forces Act 1907 which organised the former Volunteer Force into a coherent organisation, known as the Territorial Force (TF), the cadets were expanded.  Each company consisted of no less than 30 cadets, and four of these companies formed a "Cadet Battalion", the predecessors to the modern "Cadet County".

Unlike their modern successors, the first cadet battalions were administered by their local County Territorial Force Associations, and rarely ever came under an "army command".  However, following changes to the organisation of the Cadets, in 1923 all cadet forces were taken under complete control of the County Associations.

Following the reorganisation of the cadets and Territorial Force in 1908, the following cadet battalions were formed in Durham (almost all affiliated with the Durham Light Infantry):

 1st County of Durham Cadet Battalion
 Church Lads Brigade
 2nd County of Durham Cadet Battalion
 3rd County of Durham Cadet Battalion
 4th County of Durham Cadet Battalion
 5th County of Durham Cadet Battalion
 7th County of Durham Cadet Battalion
The first official mention of the 'Durham Army Cadet Force' appears in 25 May 1982 edition of the London Gazette though the county is referred to as the 'Durham and South Tyne Army Cadet Force'.

Organisation 
Each Army Cadet Force 'county' is in-fact a battalion, and each 'detachment' equivalent to that of a platoon.

 County Headquarters, Durham Army Cadet Force, at Chester le Street Army Reserve Centre, Chester le Street DH3 3SR
 County Cadet Training Team, Durham Army Cadet Force, at 
 Borneo Band and Bugles of the Durham Army Cadet Force, at Picktree Lane, Chester-le-Street DH3 3SR

ACF Mission 
The Army Cadet Force is a national, voluntary, uniformed youth organisation. It is sponsored by the British Army but not part of it and neither the cadets nor the adult volunteer leaders are subject to military call-up.  They offer a broad range of challenging adventurous and educational activities, some of them on a military theme. Their aim is to inspire young people to achieve success in life and develop in them the qualities of a good citizen.

The ACF can be compared to their counterparts in the Junior Reserve Officers' Training Corps (USA), Hong Kong Adventure Corps, and Canadian Army Cadets, amongst others.

See also 

 List of Army Cadet Force units
 Combined Cadet Force

Footnotes

Notes

Citations

References 

 

Army Cadet Force
Army Cadet Force counties
Military units and formations in County Durham